Cyclopropatriene is a hypothetical compound which is an allotrope of carbon. It was once proposed as a candidate for a spectroscopically observed tricarbon species. It is a cyclic cumulene.

References

Allotropes of carbon
Hypothetical chemical compounds
Three-membered rings
Homonuclear triatomic molecules